Pulp fiction may refer to:

 Pulp magazines, stories of varying length presented in a magazine format, printed on cheaply made wood-pulp paper
 Pulp Fiction, a 1994 film directed by Quentin Tarantino
 Pulp Fiction (soundtrack), the soundtrack album from the film
 Pulp Fiction (Banksy), a type of works by stencil graffiti artist Banksy